The House of Gonzaga is an Italian princely family that ruled Mantua in Lombardy, northern Italy from 1328 to 1708 (first as a captaincy-general, then margraviate, and finally duchy). They also ruled Monferrato in Piedmont and Nevers in France, as well as many other lesser fiefs throughout Europe. The family includes a saint, twelve cardinals and fourteen bishops. Two Gonzaga descendants became empresses of the Holy Roman Empire (Eleonora Gonzaga and Eleonora Gonzaga-Nevers), and one became queen of Poland (Marie Louise Gonzaga).

History
The first members of the family of historical importance are known to have collaborated with the Guelph faction alongside the monks of the Polirone Abbey. Starting from the 12th century they became a dominant family in Mantua, growing in wealth when their allies, the Bonacolsi, defeated the traditional familiar enemy, the Casalodi. In 1328, however, Ludovico I Gonzaga overthrew the Bonacolsi lordship over the city with the help of the Scaliger, and entered the Ghibelline party as capitano del popolo ("people's captain") of Mantua and imperial vicar of Emperor Louis IV.

Ludovico was succeeded by Guido (1360–1369) and Ludovico II (1369–1382), while Feltrino, lord of Reggio until 1371, formed the cadet branch of the Gonzaga of Novellara, whose state existed until 1728. Francesco I (1382–1407) abandoned the traditional alliance with the Visconti of Milan, in order to align their rising power with the Republic of Venice.

In 1433, Gianfrancesco I assumed the title of Marquis of Mantua with the recognition of Emperor Sigismund, while obtaining recognition from the local nobility through the marriage of his daughter Margherita to Leonello d'Este, Marquis of Ferrara in 1435. In 1530 Federico II (1500–1540) received the title of Duke of Mantua. In 1531, the family acquired the Marquisate of Montferrat through marriage. Through maternal ancestors, the Gonzagas inherited also the Imperial Byzantine ancestry of the Paleologus, an earlier ruling family of Montferrat.

A cadet branch of the Mantua Gonzagas became dukes of Nevers and Rethel in France when Luigi (Louis) Gonzaga, a younger son of Federico II Gonzaga, Duke of Mantua, and Margherita Paleologa, married the heiress. The Gonzaga-Nevers later came to rule Mantua again when Louis's son Charles (Carlo) inherited Mantua and Montferrat, triggering the War of the Mantuan Succession.

Another cadet branch were first sovereign counts, later dukes of Guastalla. They descended from Ferrante, a younger son of Duke Francesco II of Mantua (1484–1519). Ferrante's grandson, Ferrante II, also played a role in the War of the Mantuan Succession. A further cadet branch was that of Sabbioneta, founded by Gianfrancesco, son of Ludovico III.

Marie Louise Gonzaga, daughter of Prince Charles Gonzaga-Nevers, was a Polish queen consort from 1645 to her death in 1667.

Two daughters of the house, both named Eleanor Gonzaga, became Holy Roman Empresses, by marrying emperors Ferdinand II of Germany and Ferdinand III, Holy Roman Emperor, respectively. From the latter Empress Eleonora, the current heirs of the Gonzaga descend.

Saint Aloysius Gonzaga was a member of a junior branch of this family.

The House of Gonzaga is the inspiration for the play-within-the-play in Shakespeare's Hamlet.  In Act 3 scene 2, they act out a play called The Murder of Gonzago (or The Mousetrap).

Gonzaga rule continued in Mantua until 1708 and in Guastalla until 1746. Both ruling lines going extinct until passing on to a minor Gonzaga-Vescovato branch, which is the only remaining existing branch.

Family tree
The branches of the Gonzaga family, showing marquises and (subsequently) dukes of Mantua in bold, dukes of Nevers and Rethel in italics and the Guastalla line to the right.

Saint Aloysius Gonzaga 
 Aloysius Gonzaga, SJ 1568–1591, canonized by the Catholic Church in 1726

Roman Catholic cardinals
 Francesco Gonzaga (1444–1483)
 Sigismondo Gonzaga (1469–1525)
 Pirro Gonzaga (1490–1529)
 Ercole Gonzaga (1505–63)
 Francesco Gonzaga (1538–66)
 Federico Gonzaga (1540–65)
 Giovanni Vincenzo Gonzaga (1540–91)
 Scipione Gonzaga (1542–93)
 Francesco Gonzaga (1546–1620)
 Ferdinando Gonzaga (1587–1626), became Duke of Mantua, as Ferdinando I, in 1612
 Vincenzo Gonzaga (1594–1627), became Duke of Mantua, as Vincenzo II, in 1626

See also
 Duchy of Mantua, a list of House of Gonzaga rulers
 Duchy of Guastalla
 Duchy of Sabbioneta
 County of Novellara and Bagnolo

Bibliography

References

External links

Albero genealogico dei Gonzaga

 
Nobility of Mantua
Italian noble families
Priestly families
Roman Catholic families
History of Mantua
History of Lombardy